Big Ones is a compilation album released in 1989 by the Canadian rock band Loverboy. The album was the band's first compilation, including hit tracks such as "Working for the Weekend" and "Lovin' Every Minute of it". The compilation includes 3 new studio tracks: "For You", "Ain't Looking for Love" and "Too Hot". It was also released in the same year that the band decided to break up a second time, and another compilation would not be released until five years later.

Track listing

Note
 Tracks 7 and 14 are bonus tracks on the CD and cassette versions.
 Track 14, while previously released as a single and on the soundtrack to the film Top Gun, makes its first appearance on a Loverboy album here.
 Keyboard player Doug Johnson's photo does not appear on the album's back cover, although all four other members do.
 Track information and credits verified from Discogs, AllMusic, and the album's liner notes.

Personnel
 Mike Reno - lead vocals
 Paul Dean - guitar, backing vocals
 Doug Johnson - keyboards
 Scott Smith - bass
 Matt Frenette - drums

Production 
 Bruce Fairbairn -  Producer
 Paul Dean -  Producer
 Tom Allom -  Producer
 Mark Dodson -  Engineer
 Michael Fraser -  Engineer, Assistant Engineer
 Ken Lomas -  Assistant Engineer
 Bob Rock -  Producer, Engineer
 Randy Staub -  Engineer
 Keith Stein -  Engineer
 Chris Taylor -  Assistant Engineer
 Dave Ogilvie -  Assistant Engineer
 John Dexter -  Producer
 Mark Burdett -  Art Direction
 James O'Mara -  Photography
 Ron Obvious -  Assistant Engineer
 Sandee Bathgate -  Production Coordination
 Rob Porter -  Assistant Engineer

Notes 

1989 compilation albums
Loverboy albums
Albums produced by Bruce Fairbairn
Columbia Records compilation albums